Visby ishall is an indoor ice hockey venue located in Visby, Sweden. It was built in 1975 and has a capacity of 2000 spectators. It is the home venue for Visby/Roma HK. The venue has stands and seats on one long side of the rink.

References 

Indoor ice hockey venues in Sweden
Buildings and structures in Gotland County
Sports venues completed in 1975